Gierra's blind snake (Afrotyphlops gierrai), also called an Usambara spotted blind snake, is a species of snake in the family Typhlopidae.

Etymology
The specific name, gierrai, is in honor of Mr. A. Gierra, an expert in the languages of North Africa and East Africa, who collected the type specimen.

Geographic range
It is endemic to Tanzania, where it is found in the Ukaguru Mountains, the Ulaguru Mountains, and the Usambara Mountains.

References

Further reading
Broadley DG, Wallach V (2009). "A review of the eastern and southern African blind-snakes (Serpentes: Typhlopidae), excluding Letheobia Cope, with the description of two new genera and a new species". Zootaxa 2255: 1–100. (Afrotyphlops gierrai, new combination, p. 38).
Mocquard F (1897). "Note sur quelques Reptiles de Tanga, don de M. [=Monsieur ] Gierra ". Bulletin du Muséum National d'Histoire Naturelle, Paris 3 (4): 122–123. (Typhlops gierrai, new species). (in French).

gierrai
Snakes of Africa
Endemic fauna of Tanzania
Reptiles of Tanzania
Reptiles described in 1897
Taxa named by François Mocquard